The first edition of the Golden Globes (Portugal) was in 1996.

Winners

Cinema
Best Film: Adão e Eva, with Joaquim Leitão
Best Director: Joaquim Leitão in Adão e Eva
Best Actress: Maria de Medeiros in Adão e Eva
Best Actor: Joaquim de Almeida in Adão e Eva

Sports
Personality of the Year: Fernanda Ribeiro

Fashion
Personality of the Year: Nuno Gama

Theatre
Personality of the Year: Eunice Muñoz

Music
Best Performer: Dulce Pontes
Best Group: Delfins
Best Song: Sou como um Rio - Delfins

Television
Best Information Host: José Rodrigues dos Santos
Best Entertainment Host: Herman José, in Parabéns
Best Fiction and Comedy Show: Camilo e Filho
Best Entertainment Show: Chuva de Estrelas
Best Information Program: Jornal da Noite

Career Award
 David Mourão Ferreira

References

 

1995 film awards
1995 music awards
1995 television awards
Golden Globes (Portugal)
1996 in Portugal